Torre de Cristal (Portuguese and Spanish for Crystal Tower) may refer to:
Torre de Cristal, a building in Madrid (Spain).
Torre de Cristal (Recife), a famous sculpture located in Recife (Brazil).

See also
Crystal Tower (disambiguation)